Bubry is a commune in the Morbihan department of Brittany in northwestern France.

Population
Inhabitants of Bubry are called in French Bubryates.

International relations
Bubry is twinned with Macroom in the Republic of Ireland and with Marcallo con Casone in Padania; the three towns have Celtic origins.

See also
Communes of the Morbihan department
Gaston-Auguste Schweitzer Sculptor of Bubry war memorial

References
 Mayors of Morbihan Association

External links
 Cultural Heritage 

Communes of Morbihan